Dziaduszyce  is a village in the administrative district of Gmina Słaboszów, within Miechów County, Lesser Poland Voivodeship, in southern Poland.

The village has a population of 180.

References

Dziaduszyce